Cadlina willani is a species of sea slug or dorid nudibranch, a marine gastropod mollusk in the family Cadlinidae. The species is named for the renowned nudibranch taxonomist Dr. Richard C. Willan.

Distribution

Description

Ecology

References

Cadlinidae
Gastropods described in 1980